Walter Bartram (21 April 1893 – 29 September 1971) was a German politician of the Christian Democratic Union (CDU) and former member of the German Bundestag.

Life 
On 5 September 1950 Walter Bartram was elected Prime Minister of Schleswig-Holstein in a coalition with the BHE, FDP and DP. 

Bartram became a member of the CDU in 1946. He was district chairman of the CDU in Neumünster. On 4 May 1952 he succeeded Carl Schröter (CDU) in the German Bundestag.  He was then a member of the German Bundestag until 1957, representing the constituency of Segeberg - Neumünster.

Literature

References

1893 births
1971 deaths
Ministers-President of Schleswig-Holstein
Members of the Bundestag for Schleswig-Holstein
Members of the Bundestag 1953–1957
Members of the Bundestag 1949–1953
Members of the Bundestag for the Christian Democratic Union of Germany
People from Neumünster
German polo players
Olympic polo players of Germany
Polo players at the 1936 Summer Olympics